Iru Medhaigal is a 1984 Indian Tamil-language film, directed by Muktha Srinivasan and produced by Muktha Ramasami. The film stars Sivaji Ganesan, Saritha, Prabhu and Radha.

Plot 
Balaram (Sivaji Ganesan) kidnaps the children of rich but dishonorable people and ransoms them. Ranga (Prabhu) is a car thief. The two men meet when Balaram mistakenly kidnaps Ranga assuming he is Rajalingam's (M. N. Nambiar) nephew, Mahesh (Janagaraj). The confusion is cleared up and they realize that they both are searching for the same person, Devaki (Saritha). She is Ranga's long-lost older sister and she's also Balaram's ex-girlfriend. The two decide to continue working together while they search and kidnap Radha (Radha). She is the heir to a great fortune left to her by her older brother Chandrasekar (Jaishankar). Rajalingam is the manager of Radha's companies and refuses to hand over the ransom. Radha is convinced her guardian would give any ransom to see her safe. She works with the two men to get to the bottom of the mystery. Balaram and Ranga enter Radha's house under false pretenses and discover that Radha's guardian is Devaki. They also learn that Rajalingam seems to have an odd hold over her. The two must work to understand the circumstances that led Devaki to this situation and deal with Rajalingam.

Cast 

Sivaji Ganesan as Balaram
Saritha as Devaki
Prabhu as Ranga
Radha as Radha
Silk Smitha as Kavitha
Manorama
M. N. Nambiar as Rajalingam
Jaishankar as Chandrasekar (in Guest Appearance)
Major Sundarrajan in Guest Appearance
Janagaraj as Mahesh
Radha Ravi as Ravi
Vennira Aadai Moorthy as Gurumoorthy
V. Gopalakrishnan
Kathadi Ramamurthy
Typist Gopu
LIC Narasimhan

Soundtrack
Soundtrack was composed by M. S. Viswanathan.
"Nee Oru Kaditham" - S. P. Balasubrahmanyam, P. Susheela
"Adiye" - Malaysia Vasudevan
"Ennudaya" - Vani Jairam
"Ammuti Kitaru" - B. S. Sasirekha

References

External links 
 
 

1984 films
1980s Tamil-language films
Films directed by Muktha Srinivasan
Films scored by M. S. Viswanathan